Pieter Jan Cornelis "Piet" Kuiper (30 July 1934 – 10 December 2017) was a Dutch botanist. He was professor of plant physiology at the University of Groningen from 1974 to 1999.

Kuiper was born in Hoorn. He obtained his PhD in 1961 at the Landbouwhogeschool in Wageningen. Kuiper helped doctors in determining species of mushrooms in poisoning cases. He died, together with his wife, on 10 December 2017.

Kuiper was elected a member of the Royal Netherlands Academy of Arts and Sciences in 1983.

References

1934 births
2017 deaths
20th-century Dutch botanists
Members of the Royal Netherlands Academy of Arts and Sciences
People from Hoorn
Plant physiologists
Academic staff of the University of Groningen
Wageningen University and Research alumni